Jean Louis Joseph Lebeau (3 January 1794 – 19 March 1865) was a Belgian liberal statesman, the prime minister of Belgium on two occasions.

Biography
Born in Huy, he received his early education from an uncle who was parish priest in Hannut, and became a clerk. He raised money to study Law at the University of Liège, and was called to the bar association in 1819. While in Liège, he formed a fast friendship with Charles Rogier and Paul Devaux, together with whom he founded at Liege in 1824 the Mathieu Laensbergh, afterwards Le politique, a journal which helped to unite the Catholic Party with the Liberals in their opposition to the cabinet, without manifesting any open disaffection to the United Kingdom of the Netherlands.

Lebeau had not aimed for the separation of the Netherlands and Belgium, but his hand was forced by the August Revolution of 1830. He was sent by his native district to the National Congress, and became minister of foreign affairs in March 1831 during the interim regency of Érasme-Louis Surlet de Chokier. By proposing the election of Leopold of Saxe-Coburg as King of the Belgians he secured a benevolent attitude on the part of the United Kingdom, but the restoration to the Netherlands of part of the duchies of Limburg and Luxembourg provoked a heated opposition to the 1839 Treaty of London, and Lebeau was accused of treachery to Belgian interests.

He resigned the direction of foreign affairs on the accession of King Leopold, but in the next year became minister of justice. He was elected deputy for Brussels in 1833, and retained his seat until 1848. Differences with the king led to his retirement in 1834. He was subsequently governor of the Province of Namur (1838), ambassador to the Frankfurt Diet (1839), and in 1840 he formed a short-lived Liberal ministry. From this time he held no office of state, although he continued his energetic support of liberal and anti-clerical measures. He died at Huy.

Works
Lebeau published La Belgique depuis 1847 (Brussels, 4 vols., 1852), Lettres aux électeurs belges (8 vols., Brussels, 1853–1856). His  (Brussels, 1883) were edited by A. Freson.

Honours 
National
 Officer Order of Leopold.

See also
 Liberal Party

References
 In turn, it cites as references:
A. Freson, "Joseph Lebeau", in the Biographie nationale de Belgique
T. Juste, Joseph Lebeau (Brussels, 1865).

Specific

|-

1794 births
1865 deaths
Belgian Ministers of State
Governors of Namur (province)
Liberal Party (Belgium) politicians
Members of the National Congress of Belgium
People from Huy
People of the Belgian Revolution
Prime Ministers of Belgium
University of Liège alumni